FastLoad may refer to:

 Teradata FastLoad, a database utility
 Epyx FastLoad, a peripheral cartridge for the Commodore 64 computer